Lidiya Grigoryeva (born 25 January 1974 in Smychka, Chuvash ASSR) is a Russian long-distance runner from the Chuvashia region.

Running career
Grigoryeva won the bronze medal in the 10,000 metres at the 2006 European Championships in Athletics in Gothenburg, Sweden in a time of 30:32.72, a new personal best and the tenth-best time ever run by a European woman. She also won the 2006 Los Angeles Marathon in a time of 2:25:10 and the 2005 Paris Marathon in 2:27:01. Her personal best over the half marathon is 1:11:01, run in Edmonton at the 2005 IAAF World Half Marathon Championships. She was the women's 2007 Boston Marathon winner with a time of 2:29:18, and  captured the 2008 Chicago Marathon title with a 2:27:17 time.

Grigoryeva competed for Russia at the 2000 and 2004 Olympics in the 10,000 metres, finishing ninth and eighth respectively.

Doping 
In 2016, the IAAF announced that the then-42 year old Grigoryeva had been banned two-and-a-half years for doping, based on the results of her biological passport. All results from April 17, 2009 to May 14, 2010 were canceled for Grigorieva.

See also
List of doping cases in athletics
List of winners of the Boston Marathon
List of winners of the Chicago Marathon
List of European Athletics Championships medalists (women)

References

External links

Flotrack.com Video Interview Before the 2007 Boston Marathon

1974 births
Living people
People from Chuvashia
Sportspeople from Chuvashia
Russian female long-distance runners
Russian female cross country runners
Russian female marathon runners
Olympic female long-distance runners
Olympic athletes of Russia
Athletes (track and field) at the 2000 Summer Olympics
Athletes (track and field) at the 2004 Summer Olympics
World Athletics Championships athletes for Russia
European Athletics Championships medalists
Russian Athletics Championships winners
Boston Marathon female winners
Chicago Marathon female winners
Paris Marathon female winners
Doping cases in athletics
Russian sportspeople in doping cases